Mohammad A. Akim is a Jatiya Party politician and the former Member of Parliament of Comilla-7.

Career
Akim was elected to parliament from Comilla-7 as a Jatiya Party candidate in 1986.

References

Jatiya Party politicians
Living people
3rd Jatiya Sangsad members
Year of birth missing (living people)